The Federally Facilitated Marketplace (FFM) is an organized marketplace for health insurance plans operated by the U.S. Department of Health and Human Services (HHS). The FFM opened for enrollments starting October 1, 2013. The Federally Facilitated Marketplace is established in a state by the HHS Secretary for states that chose not to set up their own marketplace or did not get approval for one.

Individuals (i.e. citizens of a state) and employers will have the ability to find and purchase Qualified Health Plans through the FFM and its partners. Individuals will be able to qualify for and receive Advance Premium Tax Credits (APTC) which can be used to subsidize their premium obligations. Individuals can also qualify for Cost Sharing Reductions (CSRs) which would reduce their out-of-pocket expenses for healthcare.

Participating states 
Twenty-seven states opted to participate in the FFM. Seven states opted to partner with the FFM. Seventeen states opted to set up their own State Based Marketplace (SBM).

Federally Facilitated Marketplaces
The following 27 states are Federally Facilitated Marketplaces:

 Alabama
 Alaska
 Arizona
 Florida
 Georgia
 Indiana
 Kansas
 Louisiana
 Maine
 Mississippi
 Missouri
 Montana
 Nebraska
 North Carolina
 North Dakota
 Ohio
 Oklahoma
 South Carolina
 South Dakota
 Tennessee
 Texas
 Utah
 Virginia
 Wisconsin
 Wyoming

Partnership Marketplaces
The following 7 states are Partnership Marketplaces. In Partnership Marketplaces, states retain certain essential functionality for operating an insurance marketplace.

 Arkansas
 Delaware
 Illinois
 Iowa
 Michigan
 New Hampshire
 West Virginia

References 

Health insurance marketplaces